Early music refers to Western classical music composed during the medieval, Renaissance and sometimes Baroque eras.

Early Music may also refer to:
 Early Music (journal), an academic journal
Early Music (Lachrymæ Antiquæ), a 1997 album by the Kronos Quartet

See also
 
 Prehistoric music
 Ancient music